Awdiinle (also: Audinle, Aw Dhiinle, Aw Dīnle) is a village in the Baidoa District, Bay Region, Somalia. It is situated 25 km west of Baidoa on the main road from Baidoa to Luuq in the Gedo Region. 

In 2016 a massacre occurred in Awdiinle.

External links
Satellite view of Awdiinle (zoomable)

References

Populated places in Bay, Somalia